Obesity in India has reached epidemic proportions in the 21st century, with morbid obesity affecting 5% of the country's population. India is following a trend of other developing countries that are steadily becoming more obese. Unhealthy, processed food has become much more accessible following India's continued integration in global food markets. This, combined with rising middle class incomes, is increasing the average caloric intake per individual among middle class and high income households. Obesity is a major risk factor for cardiovascular disease, and NGOs such as the Indian Heart Association have been raising awareness about this issue.

While studying 22 different SNPs near to MC4-R gene, scientists have identified an SNP (single nucleotide polymorphism) named rs12970134 to be mostly associated with waist circumference. In this study more than two thousand individuals of Indian origin participated and the aforementioned SNP is highly prevalent in this group.

Internationally, a BMI over 25 kg/m^2 is considered overweight. Due to genetic tendency of Indians towards abdominal obesity and its associated risk of related lifestyle diseases such as diabetes and anemia, guidelines for diagnosis of obesity and abdominal obesity for India have been published in JAPI (2009) that a BMI over 23 kg/m^2 is considered overweight. Further definitions: Normal BMI: 18.0-22.9 kg/m^2, Overweight: 23.0-24.9 kg/m^2, Obesity: >25 kg/m^2.

NFHS data
This is a list of the states of India ranked in order of percentage of people who are overweight or obese, based on data from the 2015-2016 National Family Health Survey.

See also
Malnutrition in India

References

Further reading
 
 
 
 

India
Diseases and disorders in India